Neo-scholasticism (also known as neo-scholastic Thomism or neo-Thomism because of the great influence of the writings of Thomas Aquinas on the movement) is a revival and development of medieval scholasticism in Catholic theology and philosophy which began in the second half of the 19th century.

Origins
During the medieval period, scholasticism became the standard accepted method of philosophy and theology. The Scholastic method declined with the advent of humanism in the 15th and 16th centuries, after which time it came to be viewed by some as rigid and formalistic. "Scholastic philosophy did not, however, completely disappear.  An important movement of Thomistic revival took place during the 16th century and enriched Scholastic literature with many eminent contributions. Thomas de Vio Cajetan (1469–1534), Gabriel Vásquez (1551–1604), Toletus (1532–1596), Fonseca (1528–1599), and especially Francisco Suárez (1548–1617) were profound thinkers, worthy of the great masters whose principles they had adopted." Moreover, as J. A. Weisheipl emphasizes, within the Dominican Order Thomistic scholasticism has been continuous since the time of Aquinas: "Thomism was always alive in the Dominican Order, small as it was after the ravages of the Reformation, the French Revolution, and the Napoleonic occupation. Repeated legislation of the General Chapters, beginning after the death of St. Thomas, as well as the Constitutions of the Order, required all Dominicans to teach the doctrine of St. Thomas both in philosophy and in theology."  A further idea of the longstanding historic continuity of Dominican scholasticism and neo-scholasticism may be derived from the list of people associated with the Pontifical University of St. Thomas Aquinas.

In the mid-19th century, interest in Catholic circles in scholastic methodology and thought began once again to flourish, in large part in reaction against the "Modernism" inspired by thinkers such as René Descartes, Immanuel Kant and Georg Hegel, the use of which was perceived as inimical to Christian doctrine. The meaning and core beliefs of theological Modernism were never tightly defined; in large part, Modernism simply represented that which was attacked by Rome in 1907 as ‘the sum of all heresies’. Moreover, given that Modernism remained the perceived enemy of neo-Scholasticism throughout the late 19th and early 20th centuries, there were certainly changes over the decades in what was attacked. Certainly, however, common threads of thought can be detected.  These include (1) the belief that revelation continued up to and including the present day and, therefore, did not stop with the death of the last apostle; (2) the belief that dogmas were not immutable and that ecclesial dogmatic formulas could change both in interpretation and in content; (3) the use of the historical-critical method in biblical exegesis.

For many thinkers, the dangers of Modernism could only be overcome by a complete return to scholastic theology. In particular, Catholic interest came to focus on the 13th-century theologian Thomas Aquinas, whose writings were increasingly viewed as the ultimate expression of philosophy and theology, to which all Catholic thought must remain faithful.

This was particularly vigorous at first in Italy. "The direct initiator of the neo-Scholastic movement in Italy was Gaetano Sanseverino (1811–1865), a canon at Naples."  The German Jesuit Joseph Kleutgen (1811–83), who taught at Rome, was a particularly influential figure in his defences of pre-modern theology and philosophy, his argument that a theology based upon a post-Cartesian philosophy undermined Catholic doctrine, and his recommendation that the Aristotelian scientific method of Aquinas was the theology the Church now needed. The Accademia di San Tommaso, founded in 1874, published until 1891 a review entitled La Scienza Italiana. Numerous works were produced by Giovanni Maria Cornoldi (1822–92), Giuseppe Pecci, Tommaso Maria Zigliara (1833–93), Satolli (1839–1909), Liberatore (1810–92), Barberis (1847–96), Schiffini (1841–1906), de Maria, Talamo, Lorenzelli, Ballerini, Matussi and others. The Italian writers at first laid special emphasis on the metaphysical features of Scholasticism, and less to the empirical sciences or to the history of philosophy.

Papal support for such trends had begun under Pope Pius IX, who had recognized the importance of the movement in various letters. The dogma of the Immaculate Conception (1854), the Syllabus of Errors (1864) and the proclamation of papal infallibility (1870) all heralded a move away from Modernist forms of theological thought.

The most important moment for the spread of the movement occurred with Pope Leo XIII's encyclical Aeterni Patris, issued on 4 August 1879. Aeterni Patris set out what would come to be seen as the principles of neo-scholasticism, and provided the stimulus for the donation of increased support to neo-scholastic thought. It called for ‘Christian philosophy to be restored according to the spirit of St Thomas’.

Key principles

"Neo-Scholasticism is characterized by systematic investigation, analytical rigor, clear terminology, and argumentation that proceeds from first principles, chief among them that objective truth is both real and knowable." Neo-scholasticism sought to restore the fundamental doctrines embodied in the scholasticism of the 13th century. The essential conceptions may be summarized as follows:

1. God, pure actuality and absolute perfection, is substantially distinct from every finite thing: He alone can create and preserve all beings other than Himself. His infinite knowledge includes all that has been, is, or shall be, and likewise all that is possible.

2. As to our knowledge of the material world: whatever exists is itself, an incommunicable, individual substance. To the core of self-sustaining reality, in the oak-tree for instance, other realities (accidents) are added—size, form, roughness, and so on. All oak-trees are alike, indeed are identical in respect of certain constituent elements. Considering this likeness and even identity, our human intelligence groups them into one species and again, in view of their common characteristics, it ranges various species under one genus. Such is the Aristotelean solution of the problem of universals. Each substance is in its nature fixed and determined; and nothing is farther from the spirit of Scholasticism than a theory of evolution which would regard even the essences of things as products of change.

But this statism requires as its complement a moderate dynamism, and this is supplied by the central concepts of act and potency. Whatsoever changes is, just for that reason, limited. The oak-tree passes through a process of growth, of becoming: whatever is actually in it now was potentially in it from the beginning. Its vital functions go on unceasingly (accidental change); but the tree itself will die, and out of its decayed trunk other substances will come forth (substantial change). The theory of matter and form is simply an interpretation of the substantial changes which bodies undergo. The union of matter and form constitutes the essence of concrete being, and this essence is endowed with existence. Throughout all change and becoming there runs a rhythm of finality; the activities of the countless substances of the universe converge towards an end which is known to God; finality involves optimism.

3.  Man, a compound of body (matter) and of soul (form), puts forth activities of a higher order—knowledge and volition. Through his senses he perceives concrete objects, e.g. this oak; through his intellect he knows the abstract and universal (the oak). All our intellectual activity rests on sensory function; but through the active intellect (intellectus agens) an abstract representation of the sensible object is provided for the intellectual possibility. Hence the characteristic of the idea, its non-materiality, and on this is based the principal argument for the spirituality and immortality of the soul. Here, too, is the foundation of logic and of the theory of knowledge, the justification of our judgments and syllogisms.

Upon knowledge follows the appetitive process, sensory or intellectual according to the sort of knowledge. The will (appetitus intellectualis) in certain conditions is free, and thanks to this liberty man is the master of his destiny. Like all other beings, we have an end to attain and we are morally obliged, though not compelled, to attain it.

Natural happiness would result from the full development of our powers of knowing and loving. We should find and possess God in this world since the corporeal world is the proper object of our intelligence. But above nature is the order of grace and our supernatural happiness will consist in the direct intuition of God, the beatific vision. Here philosophy ends and theology begins.

Late-19th-century spread
In the period from the publication of Aeterni Patris in 1879 until the 1920s, neo-scholasticism gradually established itself as exclusive and all-pervading.

On October 15, 1879, Leo XIII created the Pontifical Academy of St. Thomas Aquinas, and ordered the publication of the critical edition, the so-called "Leonine Edition", of the complete works of Thomas Aquinas. Moreover, Leo XIII increased Thomist studies in his support for the Collegium Divi Thomae de Urbe (the future Pontifical University of Saint Thomas Aquinas, Angelicum), by founding its Faculty of Philosophy in 1882 and its Faculty of Canon Law in 1896.

Accordingly, the thought of Thomas Aquinas came to be assessed positively in relation to all other ‘modern’ systems of thought. In particular, the Aristotelianism of Thomas was seen in contrast to the thought of Kant (itself seen as representative of ‘modern’ thought). Other ‘modern’ forms of thought, including Ontologism, Traditionalism, the dualism of Anton Günther, and the thought of Descartes, were also seen as flawed in comparison to Thomism.

The movement also spread into other countries. It found supporters in Germany, Spain, the Netherlands, Belgium, England,  Switzerland, France, Hungary, the United States, Argentina, Mexico, Brazil and Australia. In Belgium, a particularly important moment was the establishment by Leo XIII at Louvain (then still a francophone university) in 1891 of the "Institut de philosophie" for the special purpose of teaching the doctrine of Aquinas together with history and the natural sciences. It was endorsed by four Catholic Congresses: Paris (1891); Brussels (1895); Freiburg (1897); Munich (1900).

Early-20th-century development
In the early 20th century, neo-Thomism became official Catholic doctrine, and became increasingly defined in opposition to Modernism. In July 1907, Pope Pius X issued the decree Lamentabili sane exitu, which condemned 65 Modernist propositions. Two months later, he issued the encyclical Pascendi Dominici Gregis, in which he unequivocally condemned the agnosticism, immanentism, and relativism of Modernism as the 'synthesis of all heresies'. The anti-Modernist oath of 1910 was very important; this remained in force until 1966. In 1914, Pope Pius X acted against Modernism by ordering, though the Sacred Congregation of Studies, the publication of a list of 24 philosophical propositions, propositions summarising the central tenets of neo-scholasticism to be taught in all colleges as fundamental elements of philosophy, which was intended to promote a purer form of Thomism; in 1916, these 24 propositions were confirmed as normative. In 1917, the Church's new Code of Canon Law (Codex Iuris Canonici) insisted that the doctrine, methods, and principles of Thomas should be used in teaching philosophy and theology. Thomist thought therefore became reflected in the manuals and textbooks widely in use in Catholic colleges and seminaries before Vatican II. It was promoted also to the laity.

Variation within the tradition
While writers such as Edouard Hugon, Réginald Garrigou-Lagrange, and Henri Grenier were maintaining the tradition of the manuals this did not mean that there was no variation or disagreement among thinkers about how best to formulate Thomism, especially in response to contemporary trends. Variation within the tradition of neo-scholastic Thomism is represented by Martin Grabmann (1875–1949), Amato Masnovo (1880–1955), Francesco Olgiati (1886–1962), and Antonin-Dalmace Sertillanges (1863–1948).  Authors such as Étienne Gilson, Jacques Maritain, and Joseph Maréchal investigated alternative interpretations of Aquinas from the 1920s until the 1950s.  Gilson and Maritain in particular taught and lectured throughout Europe and North America, influencing a generation of English-speaking Catholic philosophers.

The growth in historical investigation into Thomas's thought led some to believe that neo-Thomism did not always reflect the thought of Thomas Aquinas himself. This historically oriented theology was particularly carried out by writers such as Étienne Gilson, Marie-Dominique Chenu, and Henri de Lubac.  At Vatican II, traditional neo-Thomist thought was opposed by such exponents of the nouvelle théologie.

Many Thomists, however, continue in the neo-scholastic tradition.  Some relatively recent proponents are treated in Battista Mondin's Metafisica di san Tommaso d'Aquino e i suoi interpreti (2002), which treats Carlo Giacon (1900–1984), Sofia Vanni Rovighi (1908–1990), Cornelio Fabro (1911–1995), Carlo Giacon (1900–1984), Tomas Tyn (1950–1990), Abelardo Lobato (1925–2012), Leo Elders (1926–2019), and Enrico Berti (1935–2022), among others.  Due to its suspicion of attempts to harmonize Aquinas with non-Thomistic categories and assumptions, neo-scholastic Thomism has sometimes been called "strict observance Thomism".

Whilst discussing Anglophone theologians, Edward Feser has opined that proponents of the more traditional Thomist perspective such as Ralph McInerny foster the possibility of a contemporary revival of neo-scholastic Thomism.  Feser could be included along with these thinkers and other such as Brian Davies as engaging in a contemporary polemic in defense of the traditional system of Thomistic metaphysics in response to modern philosophy.

See also
 Mortimer J. Adler
 Anthony Kenny
 Analytical thomism

References

Further reading
 Boersma, Hans, Nouvelle Theologie and Sacramental Ontology: A Return to Mystery, (Oxford: OUP, 2009)
 Cessario, R, A Short History of Thomism, (2005)
 Kerr, Fergus, After Aquinas: Versions of Thomism, (2002)
 Kerr, Fergus, Twentieth-century Catholic theologians, (Blackwell, 2007), 
 Kerr, Fergus, ‘Thomism’, in The Cambridge Dictionary of Christian Theology, (Cambridge, 2011)
 Mettepenningen, Jürgen, Nouvelle Théologie - New Theology: Inheritor of Modernism, Precursor of Vatican II, (London: T&T Clark, 2010)
 Aveling, Rev. F. "The Neo-Scholastic Movement," The American Catholic Quarterly Review, Vol. XXXI, 1906. 
 
 Many philosophical and theological journals focus on neo-Scholasticism: Divus Thomas (since 1879); Rivista di Filosofia Neo-Scolastica (Milan, since 1909); Annales de Philosophie Chrétienne (Paris, 1830-1913); Revue néo-scolastique de Philosophie (Louvain, since 1894); Revue de Philosophie (Paris, since 1900); Revue des Sciences philosophiques et théologiques (Kain, Belgium, since 1907); Revue Thomiste (Paris, since 1893); Philosophisches Jahrbuch für Philosophie und spekulative Theologie (Paderborn, since 1887); St. Thomas Blätter (Ratisbon, since 1888); Bölcseleti-Folyóirat (Budapest, since 1886); Revista Lulliana (Barcelona, since 1901); Cienza Tomista (Madrid, since 1910). Angelicum, since 1924; The Modern Schoolman since 1925, New Scholasticism since 1927 which became American Catholic Philosophical Quarterly in 1989, The Thomist since 1939.

External links
Scholasticon by Jacob Schmutz Online Resources for the study of early-modern scholasticism (1500–1800): authors, sources, institutions 

Christian theological movements
Scholasticism
Thomism
Philosophical schools and traditions
Christian democracy